Sally Kay Mason (née Viparina on May 29, 1950) is an American academic administrator. She became the 20th President (and second female president) of University of Iowa in Iowa City, Iowa on August 1, 2007. She retired on August 1, 2015.

Early life and education
Mason was born Sally Viparina in New York and grew up in New Jersey. She graduated from the University of Kentucky in 1972 with a Bachelor of Arts degree in zoology, and as such was the first member of her family to graduate from college.  She then earned a Master of Science from Purdue University in 1974, followed by a Ph.D. in 1978 from the University of Arizona in cellular, molecular, and developmental biology.

Career
Mason conducted further research at Indiana University before accepting a position at the University of Kansas in 1981.  At the University of Kansas, Mason served as an undergraduate teacher and adviser, a full professor in the Department of Molecular Biosciences, an acting chair of the Department of Physiology and Cell Biology, an associate dean in the University's College of Liberal Arts and Sciences, and finally as the dean of that College. Mason then served as the Provost of Purdue University from 2001 until 2007.

Controversy
In February 2014, Mason sparked controversy over the issue of campus sexual assault. In an interview published in The Daily Iowan, Mason is quoted as saying that while the goal would be to end all sexual assaults on campus, she ultimately believed that goal to be "probably not a realistic goal, just given human nature.” This statement inspired anger and protests from many members of the University of Iowa community, including a coalition of individuals calling themselves "Not in My Nature" calling for an end to the "rape culture on campus" through a zero tolerance policy, funding for prevention, and sexual assault warning e-mails. The activist coalition also asked Mason to apologize for her comments, which she did on February 25, 2014.

References

1950 births
Living people
Women heads of universities and colleges
University of Kentucky alumni
Purdue University alumni
University of Arizona alumni
University of Kansas faculty
Purdue University faculty
Kentucky women in education
Presidents of the University of Iowa
American women academics
21st-century American women